The Anhalt University of Applied Sciences is a vocational university with locations in Bernburg (Saale), Dessau-Roßlau and Köthen, Germany.

History 
In the 19th century the Higher Technical Institute at Köthen provided engineers were educated with three years of study in electrical engineering, mechanical engineering, chemistry, metallurgy, and brick or ceramic art.

Locations 
Technical subjects are mainly taught in Köthen. In addition, a part of the state Studienkolleg is located here, at which students are prepared for university study in Germany. There were two departments in Bernburg: Economy and Agriculture/Conservation and Ecotrophology. Design or architecture-related courses along with the Bauhaus art school are located in Dessau.

Gallery

References 

Universities of Applied Sciences in Germany
1991 establishments in Germany
Educational institutions established in 1991
Universities and colleges in Saxony-Anhalt
Bernburg
Dessau-Roßlau
Köthen (Anhalt)